Grandperret is a surname. Notable people with the surname include: 

Patrick Grandperret (1946–2019), French film director, screenwriter, and producer
Théodore Grandperret (1818–1890), French lawyer and politician

French-language surnames